Events in the year 1786 in Norway.

Incumbents
Monarch: Christian VII

Events
The trade with Iceland is opened to all Danish and Norwegian traders.
 2 October - Lofthusreisingen begins, a large peasant revolt in South Norway.

Arts and literature

Births
15 May - Johan Bülow Wamberg, politician, (d.1852)
26 May - Engebret Soot, canal engineer (d.1859)
29 June - Peder Christian Hersleb Kjerschow, bishop (d.1866)

Full date unknown
Samuel Mathiassen Føyn, ship-owner and politician (d.1854)

Deaths
18 February – Ludvig Daae, priest and landowner (born 1723).

Full date unknown
 Anders Olsen, trader, explorer and colonial administrator (born 1718)

See also